The Assam Higher Secondary Education Council (abbreviated as AHSEC) is a state education regulatory board under the jurisdiction of Ministry of Education, Government of Assam that is responsible to regulate, supervise and develop the system of Higher Secondary Education ( + 2 stage ) in the State of Assam.

Languages 
AHSEC offers education in the following languages: 
 Modern Indian Languages Assamese, Bengali, Bodo, Garo, Hmar, Hindi, Khasi, Meitei (Manipuri), Mizo, Nepali & Urdu. 
 Advance Languages Advance Assamese, Advance Bengali, Advance Bodo, Advance Hindi & Advance Manipuri.

Overview
The Assam Higher Secondary Education Council was established by the Assam government on 1 June 1984 to regulate, supervise and develop the system of higher secondary education in the State of Assam. AHSEC officially announce the results in June.

References

Education in Assam
1984 establishments in Assam
Organizations established in 1984
School boards in India
High school course levels